Şeyh Hasan (formerly Tabandüzü) is a village in the Baskil District of Elazığ Province in Turkey. The village is populated by Turkmens who adhere to Alevism and had a population of 85 in 2021.

The hamlets of Akkonak and Pınar are attached to the village.

References

Villages in Baskil District